Nurbani Yusuf Kantjasungkana (December 25, 1939 – October 22, 2015) was an Indonesian actress and model turned lawyer and politician. She entered the Indonesian film industry in 1958 by taking a role in Asrama Dara and soared to popularity with Usmar Ismail's directed film Anak Perawan di Sarang Penjamun (The Virgin in the Robbers' Nest).

Early life 
Nurbani Yusuf was born on 25 December 1939 in Bengkulu, Dutch East Indies. She was the only daughter from the ten children of Muhammad Yusuf (1905–1961) and Kalsum binti Syam (1917–1957). Her brothers were Rusdy Yusuf (1943–1990) and Abdul Salihin Yusuf (1947–2022).

Personal life 
Yusuf married an entrepreneur named Kusumanegara in 1968, the couple had two daughter.

Their marriage lasted until Kusumanegara's death.

Notable cases

Sawito cases 
Yusuf defended Sawito Kartowibowo, an agricultural department employee who was arrested on charges of treason. She later say that Sawito's detention as an " arbitrary act of atrocity " and asserted that he was a victim of calumny on the part of some of Suharto opponents, whom she referred to as "hidden directors" of the trial.

Arie Hanggara cases 
Yusuf defended Santi, the wife of Machtino and the step mother of Arie Hanggara, a kid who was molested and beaten to death by his father on 8 November 1984. Santi was then sentenced to two years in prison because it was considered that she only helped Machtino in torturing Hanggara.

Death 
Yusuf died at Mount Elizabeth Hospital in Singapore, on 22 October 2015 at the age of 75.

Filmography 
During her six year acting career Yusuf acted in some five films.

 Asrama Dara (1958)
 Tjita-Tjita Ajah (1960)
 Bayangan di Waktu Fadjar (1962)
 Anak Perawan di Sarang Penjamun (1962)
 Tauhid (1964)

References 

1939 births
2015 deaths
People from Bengkulu
Indonesian actresses
20th-century Indonesian actresses
20th-century Indonesian lawyers
People of Minangkabau descent
University of Indonesia alumni
Indonesian Muslims